Ittihad Riadhi Bir Mourad Raïs, more commonly known as IR Bir Mourad Raïs, is an Algerian football club based in Bir Mourad Raïs, Algiers. It was founded in 1947 and currently plays in the Ligue Régional II.

On February 25, 2012, IR Bir Mourad Raïs qualified for the first time to the Round of 16 of the Algerian Cup after beating ES Ben Aknoun 2–1 in the second round of the 2011–12 Algerian Cup.

References

Association football clubs established in 1947
Football clubs in Algeria
Football clubs in Algiers
1947 establishments in Algeria